Hydroseeding (or hydraulic mulch seeding, hydro-mulching, hydraseeding) is a planting process that uses a slurry of seed and mulch. It is often used as an erosion control technique on construction sites, as an alternative to the traditional process of broadcasting or sowing dry seed.

Description
The hydroseeding slurry is transported in a tank, either truck-mounted or trailer-mounted and sprayed over prepared ground. Helicopters have been used to cover larger areas. Aircraft application may also be used on burned wilderness areas after a fire, and in such uses may contain only soil stabilizer to avoid introducing non-native plant species. Hydroseeding is an alternative to the traditional process of broadcasting or sowing dry seed. A study conducted along the lower Colorado River in Arizona reported that hydroseeding could be used to restore riparian vegetation in cleared land.

The slurry often has other ingredients including fertilizer, tackifying agents, fiber mulch, and green dye.

History
Originating back to the USA in the 1940s, Maurice Mandell from the Connecticut Highway Department discovered that by mixing seed and water together, the resulting mulch could be spread and sprayed over the steep and otherwise inaccessible slopes of the Connecticut expressways.

Advantages
If planting a relatively large area, hydroseeding can be completed in a very short period of time. It can be very effective for hillsides and sloping lawns to help with erosion control and quick planting. Hydroseeding will typically cost less than planting with sod, but more than broadcast seeding. Results are often quick with high germination rates producing grass growth in about a week and mowing maintenance beginning around 3 to 4 weeks from the date of application. Fiber mulch accelerates the growing process by maintaining moisture around the seeds thereby increasing the rate of germination.

Facts about hydroseeding 

 Seeds are applied to tilled soil using a high pressure hose. The seeds are likely mixed into a water-based spray that often contains mulch, fertilizer, lime, or other substances that promote seed growth.
 This technique is usually used to plant grass, but it is not uncommon to see it being used to plant wildflowers or groundcovers. 
 It helps prevent erosion. 
 If you need to plant seeds on a steep slope (or other difficult terrain), hydroseeding is a great option. Generally speaking, hydroseeding is more expensive than traditional planting methods but cheaper than purchasing and installing sod. 
 When planting seeds on large areas of land, the hydroseeding method is cost effective and will likely save you money in the long run. However, if it is being used on small or residential areas, the cost can add up quick.
 It is customizable. You can plant lots of different types of seeds using this method.

References

Agricultural terminology
Environmental soil science
Gardening aids
Habitat management equipment and methods
Lawns